A range war or range conflict is a type of usually violent conflict, most commonly in the 19th and early 20th centuries in the American West. The subject of these conflicts was control of "open range", or range land freely used for cattle grazing, which gave the conflict its name. Typically they were disputes over water rights or grazing rights and cattle ownership.

Range wars occurred prior to the Taylor Grazing Act of 1934, which regulated grazing allotments on public land. Range wars included the Pleasant Valley War, Colfax County War, Castaic Range War, San Elizario Salt War, Mason County War, Porum Range War, Johnson County War, Pecos War, Fence Cutting Wars, Sheep Wars, Barber–Mizell feud, Stuart's Stranglers conflict, and others.

Range wars in literature and the arts
Range wars have been the subject of movies and novels. Some examples are:
Range War (1939) is a movie (featuring Hopalong Cassidy) about a group of ranchers in conflict with a railway company.
 Range War, a 2000 novel by Lauran Paine about the Johnson County War.
The Virginian, a 1902 novel by Owen Wister, was based on the Johnson County Range War, presenting the case of the large ranchers and depicting the lynchings as frontier justice for cattle rustling. It was adapted four times as films.
Shane is a 1953 movie (featuring Alan Ladd) that tells the story of a gunfighter taking the side of the farmers against cattlemen during a fictional range war loosely based on the Johnson County Range War.
The Redhead from Wyoming a 1953 film with Maureen O'Hara featuring a fictionalised Johnson County War.
Man Without a Star, 1955, with Kirk Douglas.
To The Last Man: A Story of the Pleasant Valley War, is a novel by Western author Zane Grey exploring the Pleasant Valley War in 1880s Arizona.
Oklahoma! (1943 Broadway musical, 1955 film) Rodgers and Hammerstein musical about a cowboy in love with a farm girl, complicated by a rivalry between local farmers and ranchers over fences and water rights.
El Dorado is a 1966 movie about an aging gunfighter who goes "straight" to help a lawman friend after being hired to intervene in a range war.
Chisum is a 1970 western movie loosely based on the 1878 Lincoln County War in New Mexico Territory, which erupted over mercantile economic competition rather than issues of range.
Centennial (1978) features an episode titled 'The Shepherds' , which depicted a range war between cattlemen on one hand, against farmers and sheepherders on the other.
A range war is referred to as the reason that cattle are being sold at low prices to a railroad in the twenty-third episode of Hell on Wheels.
Heaven's Gate (1980) is loosely based on the Johnson County War.
Tom Horn (1980), scripted from the journals of Horn, Steve McQueen.
"Johnson County War" is a 1989 song by Country Western singer/songwriter Chris LeDoux for the Powder River album.
"The Range War," a ballad by Todd Rundgren, focuses on a relationship between a boy whose "uncle runs cattle" and a girl whose "daddy runs sheep," and hints their relationship was opposed by both families, fueling this particular range war.
Open Range (2003), a film in which free-grazers take on a cattle baron who tries to use hired assassins to steal their herd.
A range war was the subject of at least one episode of long-running old time radio show, Gunsmoke, called "Jaliscoe".
A range war was used as a plot in the 12th season of the TV show Dallas.
King of Texas is a 2002 American television movie transposing the plot of William Shakespeare's King Lear into the 19th-century American West.
1923 (2023), a prequel to the Yellowstone franchise written by Taylor Sheridan, features a ranch war in several episodes.

Usage
While in previous centuries violence may have been involved, the term is now applied to nonviolent competition for scarce resources, such as between ranchers and environmentalists, or between ranchers and fans of wild horses.

A range war is also a slang term for a turf war or disagreement about proper hierarchy or relationship and is often used in a joking manner. In this sense, the term is found in politics and business.

See also

 List of feuds in the United States
 Sheep Wars
 County seat war

Notes and references

American frontier
Cowboy culture
 01
Internal wars of the United States
Western (genre) staples and terminology